{{Infobox basketball club
| name            = UCAM Murcia
| logo            = CB Murcia logo.svg
| logo_size       = 150px
| nickname        = Universitarios
| leagues         = Liga ACBChampions League
| founded         = 1985
| dissolved       = 
| history         = Agrupacion Deportiva Juver(1985–1993)CB Murcia (1993–2013)UCAM Murcia CB (2013–present)
| arena           = Palacio de Deportes
| capacity        = 7,454
| location        = Murcia, Spain
| colors          = Blue, Golden, Red  
| current         = 
| president       = José Luis Mendoza
| coach           = Sito Alonso
| captain         = 
| ownership       = Universidad Católica de Murcia
| championships   = ''4 LEB Oro championship1 Copa Príncipe de Asturias
| website         = ucammurcia.com
| h_body          = E20E0E
| h_pattern_b     = _whitesides
| h_shorts        = E20E0E
| h_pattern_s     = _whitesides
| a_body          = FFFFFF
| a_pattern_b     = _redsides
| a_shorts        = FFFFFF
| a_pattern_s     = _redsides
| 3_body          = 004379
| 3_pattern_b     = _whitesides
| 3_shorts        = 004379
| 3_pattern_s     = _whitesides
}}UCAM Universidad Católica de Murcia Club de Baloncesto, S.A.D., more commonly referred to as UCAM Murcia, is a professional basketball team based in Murcia, Spain. It plays their home games at Palacio de Deportes.

 History 
Founded in 1985 under the name Agrupación Deportiva Júver, Murcia agreed with a Madrid-based club, Logos de Madrid, to buy out its rights to play in the Spanish second division. Murcia would play at that level for four consecutive seasons and its first superstar was do-it-all big man Randy Owens.

In 1990, Murcia, led by veteran center Mike Phillips, beat Obradoiro in a playoffs series to gain promotion to the Spanish League. The club would stay in the Spanish elite for the next seven seasons, with stars likes Ralph McPherson, Clarence Kea, Michael Anderson and Johnny Rogers and head coaches like Felipe Coello, José María Oleart and Moncho Monsalve. In December 1991, Kea pulled down 29 rebounds, which remains a Spanish League record, in a win against Breogán Lugo.

The club became CB Murcia in 1993 and moved to its current arena, Palacio de Deportes, the following season. Murcia organized the Copa del Rey tournament in the 1995–96 season and made it to the semifinals. Murcia went down to the Spanish second division at the end of the 1996–97 season, but reached the Spanish elite a couple of times, including in 2006, when it downed CAI Zaragoza in overtime in a do-or-die game to advance. Led by Jimmie Hunter and Juanjo Triguero, Murcia ranked 12th in the 2007–08 season, but went back to the second division two years later. Murcia bounced back to score promotion directly with a 30–4 record, and has been in the Spanish elite even since.

In 2013, the club switched hands and UCAM Murcia took control. That moved helped Murcia shine in the last couple of seasons for its best results ever. With Diego Ocampo as head coach and Scott Bamforth, Raulzinho Neto and Carlos Cabezas as its top newcomers, Murcia finished the Spanish regular season with a 17–17 record, which was just one win from the playoffs. Last season Murcia found a new coach in Fotios Katsikaris and added more experienced players like Facundo Campazzo, Serhiy Lishchuk and Vítor Faverani. That led to a seventh-place finish with an 18–16 record and a ticket to the quarterfinals for the first time in the club's history, where it lost 2–1 to Real Madrid in the quarterfinals, but earned the right to make its debut in European competitions in the 2016–17 EuroCup. In its European debut, UCAM Murcia reached the Top 16 round.

In the next season, the club joined the Basketball Champions League, reaching the Final Four in its first participation. Murcia lost to AEK in the semifinals and won the third place game over MHP Riesen Ludwigsburg.

 Sponsorship naming 
CB Murcia has received diverse sponsorship names along the years:
Juver Murcia: 1985–1992
CB Murcia Artel: 1997–1998
Recreativos Orenes CB Murcia: 1998–1999
CB Etosa/Etosa Murcia: 2000–2003
Polaris World CB Murcia: 2003–2008
UCAM Murcia: 2011–present

 Logos 

 Home arenas 
Pabellón Príncipe Felipe: (1985–94)Palacio de Deportes: (1994–present)

 Players 

 Current roster 

 Depth chart 

 Head coaches 

Felipe Coello: 1985–1991, 1991–1992, 1992, 1998, 2002–2004
Moncho Monsalve: 1991, 1993
Clifford Luyk: 1991
Fernando Sánchez Luengo: 1991
Iñaki Iriarte: 1992
José María Oleart: 1993–1996, 2002
Ricardo Hevia: 1996
Alberto Sanz: 1996–1997
Manolo Flores: 1998–2000
Pepe Rodríguez: 2000–2002
Miguel Ángel Martín: 2004
Iván Déniz: 2004–2005
Chete Pazo: 2005
Manel Comas: 2005–2006
Manolo Hussein: 2006–2009
Moncho Fernández: 2009
Edu Torres: 2009–2010
Luis Guil: 2010–2012
Óscar Quintana: 2012–2014, 2016–2017
Marcelo Nicola: 2014
Diego Ocampo: 2014–2015
Fotios Katsikaris: 2015–2016, 2017
Ibon Navarro: 2017–2018
Javier Juárez: 2018–2019
Sito Alonso: 2019–present

 Season by season 

 Trophies and awards 

 Domestic competitions 2nd division championships: (4)1ª División B: (1) 1990LEB Oro: (3) 1998, 2003, 2011Copa Príncipe de Asturias: (1)2006

European competitionsBasketball Champions LeagueThird place (1): 2017–18

Other competitionsYecla, Spain Invitational Game: (1)2014

 Individual awards ACB Three Point Shootout ChampionPedro Robles – 2009All-ACB Second TeamFacundo Campazzo – 2017LEB Oro MVPTony Smith – 1998All LEB Oro First Team'''
Pedro Rivero – 2011

Notable players 

 José Ángel Antelo
 Carlos Cabezas
 Rodrigo San Miguel
 Yanick Moreira
 Facundo Campazzo
 Federico Kammerichs
 Federico Van Lacke
 David Barlow
 Vítor Benite
 Vítor Faverani
 Augusto Lima
 Raulzinho Neto
 Bojan Bogdanović
 Kim Tillie
 Blagota Sekulić
 Ime Udoka
 Thomas Kelati
 Miloš Vujanić
 Anton Gavel
 Goran Dragić
 James Augustine
 Johnny Rogers
 Michael Anderson (basketball)
 Corey Crowder
 Marcus Fizer
 Matt Nover
 Lou Roe
 Andre Turner
 Donatas Slanina
 Tomas Delininkaitis
 Martynas Pocius

References

External links 

Official website 
UCAM Murcia at ACB.com 

Basketball teams in the Region of Murcia
 
Liga ACB teams
Basketball teams established in 1985
Former LEB Oro teams
1985 establishments in Spain